Victory Park is a memorial park in the Auto Factory District (Avtozavodsky rajon) of Tolyatti, Russia. The park is dedicated to the Soviet victory in World War II.

Among the monuments and sculptures in the park are:
The Victory Monument (1985) by Simon Winograd
Monument to the Soldiers of the Afghan War (1994) by N. I. Kolesnikov
On The Beach (1987) by V. V. Kravchenk

References

Parks in Tolyatti
World War II memorials in Russia
Geography of Samara Oblast
Tourist attractions in Samara Oblast
Soviet military memorials and cemeteries